The Darfur representative football team, also called Darfur United, is an association football team representing Darfur, a region in western Sudan. Their players all live in refugee camps in neighbouring Chad. They have competed in the 2012 VIVA World Cup and the 2014 ConIFA World Football Cup.

Overview
Darfur United was formed in March 2012 with representatives from twelve Darfuri refugee camps located in Chad, invited to try out for the Darfur United team. 16 players were initially selected with four players also offered roster spots in the case of the need to replace any players. The team participated in the 2012 Viva World Cup, which was hosted by Kurdistan Iraq in June.

The operational aspects of this football team have been overseen and orchestrated by i-ACT, a humanitarian group located in Los Angeles, California, and directed by Gabriel Stauring and his team of volunteers.

The team's head coach is Mark Hodson of EVO Soccer Programs and formerly the Sand and Surf Soccer Club, based in Manhattan Beach, CA. Hodson is an NSCAA Premier License holder and has been a professional coach since 1999.

Ben Holden of Bradford, UK, became the team's assistant coach in May 2012 to help manage the team at the 2012 Viva World Cup in Iraq/Kurdistan.   The 27-year-old worked as a coach in Los Angeles in 2006 for a year; head coach Mark Hodson (whom he met whilst coaching in the US) called him and asked him how he felt about assisting him coaching Darfur United in June's Viva World Cup 2012.

The 16 players who made up Darfur United’s squad were all former Sudanese refugees who, having escaped the war-torn area, got the chance to represent Darfur abroad in a global competition.

2012 VIVA World Cup
After Darfur lost the two Group Matches against Northern Cyprus (0–15) and Provence (0–18) in Group C, they had to play a Qualification Match for the 5th to 8th Place Semi Finals. As the Darfuri team lost the match against Western Sahara 1–5, they ranked 9th and last in their first international competition. Moubarak Haggar Dougom scored the first goal ever for Darfur in the 46th minute.

2014 ConIFA World Football Cup 
Darfur competed in the 2014 ConIFA World Football Cup, losing all their matches and winning the fair play award.

World Cup record

Notable players

  Khalid Abdulkhalik - national team top scorer and played for University of the Southwest

References 

Infos (www.hartlepoolmail.co.uk)
"Darfuri refugees close in on stateless World Cup" (voanews.com)
Infos (outcasts-book.blogspot.co.uk)
"Darfur refugee football team" (voanews.com)
"Watch Darfur United kicking" (enoughproject.com)

External links 
 Official website of Darfur United
 "Darfur refugees beat odds to play football in Iraq" (khaleejtimes.com)

National Football Team
Football in Sudan
African N.F.-Board teams
African national and official selection-teams not affiliated to FIFA